George Washington Kittredge (January 31, 1805 – March 6, 1881) was a U.S. Representative from New Hampshire.

Born in Epping, New Hampshire, Kittredge received a liberal schooling. He attended the medical department of Harvard University and engaged in the practice of medicine in Newmarket, New Hampshire, in 1835.

Kittredge served as member of the New Hampshire House of Representatives in 1835, 1847, 1848, and 1852, and served as Speaker in the last-named year. He was a director of the Boston and Maine Railroad, 1836-1856. He served as president of the Newmarket Savings Bank for forty years.

Kittredge was elected as an Anti-Nebraska Democrat to the Thirty-third Congress (March 4, 1853 – March 3, 1855). He served as chairman of the Committee on Expenditures in the Department of War (Thirty-third Congress). He was an unsuccessful candidate for reelection in 1854 to the Thirty-fourth Congress and for election in 1856 to the Thirty-fifth Congress.

Following his time in Washington, Kittredge resumed the practice of medicine. He died in Newmarket, New Hampshire on March 6, 1881. He was interred in Forest Hills Cemetery in Boston.

References

1805 births
1881 deaths
Harvard Medical School alumni
American bankers
Speakers of the New Hampshire House of Representatives
Democratic Party members of the New Hampshire House of Representatives
Democratic Party members of the United States House of Representatives from New Hampshire
19th-century American politicians
People from Epping, New Hampshire
People from Newmarket, New Hampshire
Physicians from New Hampshire
19th-century American businesspeople